Mănăstireni is a commune in Cluj County, Transylvania, Romania, located on the Căpuș River. It is composed of six villages: Ardeova (Erdőfalva), Bedeciu (Bedecs), Bica (Kalotabikal), Dretea (Deréte), Mănăstireni and Mănășturu Românesc (Felsőgyerőmonostor).

It is known for its churches, some of them made in wood.

Demographics 
According to the census from 2002 there was a total population of 1,809 people living in this commune. Of this population, 85.90% are ethnic Romanians, 10.94% are ethnic Hungarians and 3.15% ethnic Romani.

Picture gallery

References

Atlasul localităților județului Cluj (Cluj County Localities Atlas), Suncart Publishing House, Cluj-Napoca, 

Communes in Cluj County
Localities in Transylvania
Mănăstireni